O14 is a set of model railway standards.

O14 may also refer to:

 O-14 (Dubai), a skyscraper in the United Arab Emirates
 Douglas O-14, an aircraft
 , a submarine of the Royal Netherlands Navy
 Oxygen-14, an isotope of oxygen
 , a submarine of the United States Navy